The  ISW Tytan  (Polish: Indywidualny System Walki Tytan "Individual Warfare System Titan") is a Polish Future Soldier military project. The project started in 2006 and is currently in its first stage of development.

First Polish industry proposal of the new battle gear has been shown on 2008 Future Soldier Fair in Czech Republic. The soldier modernization program developed by Bumar Group is called "Ułan 21"("Uhlan 21")

Main Objectives
 Creating new generation of battle uniforms
 Creating new generation of tactical equipment
 Developing new electronics and optics technologies
 Developing new communication systems
 Modernisation of equipment and adjusting it to current standards
 Researching new generation ballistic shields

Equipment
 Main Weapon
 Personal Computer (GPS system, Maps, Nightvision, Friend or Foe System, communications system, Weapon's crosshair system)
 Lithium-ion battery
 Helmet with display, headphones and microphone
 Modular body armor

Tests
Elements of battle gear will be tested by Zintegrowana Grupa Bojowa (Integrated Battle Group).
Group consists of:
 GROM soldiers who tested Land Warrior system in United States.
 Selected officers of 1.PSK
 Formoza operators
 Communications and IT experts
 German instructors from Infanterist der Zukunft (German future soldier program)

Proposed military equipment
Future soldier programs
Polish Land Forces